Georgi Petkov (born 14 March 1976) is a Bulgarian football goalkeeper who plays for and captains Slavia Sofia. Petkov has played for Bulgarian national team since 1998 as a backup to Zdravko Zdravkov and Dimitar Ivankov and has now made an appearance for the Bulgarian national team at the age of 42.

Career

Hebar Pazardzhik and Slavia Sofia
Born in Pazardzhik, Petkov started his career at local side Hebar. In June 1996, he was signed by A PFG club Slavia Sofia. Petkov started the 1996–97 season as the third choice goalkeeper and earned only two appearances in his first campaign at Slavia. Following Zdravko Zdravkov's transfer to Turkish İstanbulspor in June 1997, he was promoted to second choice.

Levski Sofia
In July 2001, Petkov joined Levski Sofia for a $400,000, breaking the Bulgarian goalkeeper transfer-record. He was a substitute of Dimitar Ivankov until that season.
 
After Ivankov left Levski, Petkov showed his real potential and became an important part of the team. With Petkov as a key player, his team was the first Bulgarian team to join the group stage of the UEFA Champions League. He was one of the few players that had their positions secure during the 07-08 transfer season, when a big part of the Levski players were sold. On 25 April 2008 a media report said that Petkov was wanted by Besiktas J.K. during the summer transfer season.

Petkov became a captain of PFC Levski, during the 2008/2009 season.

On 24 January 2008, during the pause of 2008/2009 season, Petkov was the number one goalkeeper in Europe, according to IMScouting. He conceded the fewest goals per minute. Petkov conceded one goal every 810 minutes.

He became a Champion of Bulgaria in 2009, after a contradictory but great season under the coaching of Emil Velev. Despite the bad results during the autumnal part of the season, after great matches in the spring, Levski Sofia fulfilled the plan before the term had set and became a champion for 26 time, before the last round has been played.

During 2009/2010 season, the Levski's team started their European campaign with 9:0 (on aggregate) in the second Qualifying round of Champions League against UE Sant Julià. On the next round, Levski Sofia faced FK Baku. The blues eliminated the team from Azerbaijan with 2:0 (on aggregate). In the play-off round Levski was eliminated by Debreceni VSC with 4:1 (on aggregate). However, Levski qualified for UEFA Europa League. In the group stage, Levski faced Villarreal CF, SS Lazio and Red Bull Salzburg. Levski achieved only one win and 5 losses. Levski took the win against SS Lazio, after Hristo Yovov scored the winning goal in the match. The match was played at Stadio Olimpico.
In 2009/2010 season, after couple of bad games and results, Levski however achieved qualifying for UEFA Europa League becoming 3rd in the final ranking.

During the 2010/2011 Levski qualified for UEFA Europa League after eliminating Dundalk F.C., Kalmar FF and AIK Fotboll. Levski was drawn in Group C, facing Gent, Lille and Sporting CP. The first match was against Gent. Levski won the match in a 3–2 home win. The winning goal was scored by Serginho Greene. With this win Levski recorded 8 games in-a-row without losing in European competitions. After that Levski lost catastrophically from Sporting CP with 5–0. Followed by another loss against Lille. In Sofia Levski played very well against Lille and was leading 2–1 until Ivo Ivanov scored an own goal to make it 2–2. In the last match of the Group C, Levski take a win against Sporting CP with 1–0, the winning goal was scored by Daniel Mladenov.

On 10 January 2011, it was announced that Petkov is being released from the club. After ten years in Levski, Petkov told the media that he felt insulted by the actions of his former club.

Enosis Neon Paralimni
Georgi Petkov signed for Enosis Paralimni on 21 January 2011, making a winning debut 24 hours later, by beating Ermis Aradippou 3–1 in Tasos Markou Stadium.

Return to Slavia
Petkov rejoined Slavia Sofia on 22 June 2012. He quickly established himself as the first choice goalkeeper for the team.

On 9 May 2018, at the age of 42, Petkov was named man of the match in the 2018 Bulgarian Cup Final against Levski Sofia. He played an important role in the penalty shoot-out held after the teams remained tied 0–0 after extra time, making two saves.

On 12 July 2018, Petkov captained Slavia in the 1:0 away win over Finnish team Ilves in the first qualifying round of the Europa League, becoming the oldest Bulgarian footballer to appear in a European club tournament match.

International career
Petkov earned 16 caps for Bulgaria between 1998 and 2009. He first played in the national team in the friendly 1–4 loss to Morocco in December 1998. In October 2018, after a 9-year absence from international duty and 20 years after his debut, he was recalled by Petar Hubchev for the UEFA Nations League matches against Cyprus and Norway. On 16 November 2018, in the 1:1 away draw with the Cypriots Petkov became the oldest European goalkeeper to play in an official match of their respective national team at the age of 42 years and 248 days. The previous record holder was Elisha Scott who played for Northern Ireland at the age of 42 years and 200 days. Petkov also played 3 days later against Slovenia.

Career statistics

Club
Updated 23 February 2022

International
.

Honours

Club
Levski Sofia
Bulgarian League (4): 2001–02, 2005–06, 2006–07, 2008–09
Bulgarian Cup (4): 2001–02, 2002–03, 2004–05, 2006–07
Bulgarian Supercup (3): 2005, 2007, 2009
Slavia Sofia
Bulgarian Cup (1): 2017–18

Individual
 Bulgarian Goalkeeper of the Year (4): 2002, 2007, 2008, 2018
 Bulgarian Footballer of the Year: 2nd place (2008, 2018), 3rd place (2007)

References

External links
 
 

1976 births
Living people
Bulgarian footballers
Bulgarian expatriate footballers
First Professional Football League (Bulgaria) players
Cypriot First Division players
FC Hebar Pazardzhik players
PFC Levski Sofia players
PFC Slavia Sofia players
Enosis Neon Paralimni FC players
Bulgaria international footballers
Expatriate footballers in Cyprus
Sportspeople from Pazardzhik
Association football goalkeepers